Robert John Babington, DSC, QC (9 April 1920 – 17 September 2010) was an Ulster Unionist Party politician, who served as the member of the House of Commons of Northern Ireland for North Down from 1969 to 1972, and a county court judge. He was born in Dublin.

Early life
Born into the Anglo-Irish Babington family, the son of David and Alice Babington, Robert Babington was educated at Saint Columba's College, Dublin and Trinity College Dublin. He served the United Kingdom in the Second World War, earning the Distinguished Service Cross, and was aboard the aircraft carrier  for the Battle of Crete as a member of the Royal Navy Volunteer Reserve attached to the Fleet Air Arm. He subsequently embarked on a career in law and politics in Northern Ireland. He married Elizabeth Alton, the daughter of Ernest Alton, in 1952; the couple had had two sons (Philip Babington and David Babington) and a daughter (Bryanna Jane Babington).

He was a great-grandson of The Rev. Hume Babington and a first cousin once removed to Sir Anthony Babington.

Politics
Although he argued in 1961 in favour of discrimination in favour of unionists in employment, Babington became known as a moderate within the UUP. He supported the principle of full and equal voting rights during his 1969 campaign and advocated the expulsion of any party member who refused to follow the edicts of the British government fully. He was a staunch critic of any Unionist involvement in political violence and a vocal opponent of Ulster nationalism. The collapse of the Parliament was the effective end of Babington's career in politics and he left the Orange Order in 1973.

Law
Babington was called to the bar in 1947 and was made a QC in 1965. During the early part of the Troubles Babington served as prosecuting counsel at a number of high=profile trials related to the conflict. He was appointed as a county court judge  in 1974, retiring in 1992.

References

1920 births
2010 deaths
Judges in Northern Ireland
Members of the House of Commons of Northern Ireland 1969–1973
People educated at St Columba's College, Dublin
Place of birth missing
Place of death missing
20th-century King's Counsel
Recipients of the Distinguished Service Cross (United Kingdom)
Royal Naval Volunteer Reserve personnel of World War II
Royal Navy officers of World War II
Ulster Unionist Party members of the House of Commons of Northern Ireland
Robert
Members of the House of Commons of Northern Ireland for County Down constituencies